Cristian Tudor Popescu (often referred to as CTP; born October 1, 1956) is a Romanian journalist, essayist, engineer, short-story writer and political commentator. Author of science fiction stories during his youth, he also hosted talk shows for various television stations, and had contributions as a literary critic and translator.

Popescu was the editor-in-chief of Adevărul, and, in 2005, he founded the newspaper Gândul in association with Mircea Dinescu. He was also the president of the Romanian Press Club until November 2006, when he resigned his office over an issue regarding the representation of journalists in the Club. He was re-elected president on February 10, 2007. Based on opinion polls, he was designated Romania's best journalist four years in a row 2005–2008.

Biography
A native of Bucharest, he graduated Politehnica University in 1981, majoring in automation engineering. Popescu began writing fiction during the communist regime, focusing on his journalistic career after the Romanian Revolution of 1989. His first publication was 1984 in the Echinox literary magazine of Cluj-Napoca with the SF story Grădina de cenușă ("The Ash Garden"). Popescu's work was subsequently featured in most SF anthologies, almanacs and magazines before 1990, and he was twice a laureate of the ROMCON Awards (1985, 1986). He received the Eurocon Award for the collection of short stories Planetarium.

After 1990, he confined his SF activity to translating and editing the works of others.
Popescu translated Stanisław Lem's novels Manuscript Found in a Bathtub, Return from the Stars, as well as Norman Spinrad's Bug Jack Barron (in collaboration with Dan Mihai Pavelescu). As an editor of SF literature, he published Dănuț Ungureanu's novel Marilyn Monroe on a Closed Curve (1993), Dan Merișca's Revolt in Labyrinth (1996), and the SF anthology The Empire of the Crooked Mirrors (1993).

Between 1990 and 2005, Popescu was the editor-in-chief of Adevărul newspaper. In disagreement with the management, he and 81 journalists resigned from the paper and, together with Mircea Dinescu, started their own publication, Gândul, however Mircea Dinescu resigned in January 2008.

Together with Emil Hurezeanu he was also a co-host of the TV two-man political talk show Cap și Pajură (Heads and Tails) broadcast on Realitatea TV.

Cristian Tudor Popescu is a film analyst, Ph.D. in cinematography of the National University of Theatrical and Cinematographic Art I. L. Caragiale, Bucharest, where he is teaching a course on Manipulation and Propaganda Techniques in Movie and Television.

Since 2006, Cristian Tudor Popescu is the host of the TV show CineTePrinde, broadcast each Saturday, starting from 10 PM, on Pro Cinema, where he comments a movie, which is given afterwards, from a critical point of view. He is member of UCIN and Writers' Union of Romania.

A fact that has become widely known in the last years is that CTP is an accomplished tennis player having won numerous national tournaments in the 55+ senior category competing against as many as 140 contestants at an event.

Political commentator
He was until 2022 a political commentator at the Romanian private TV station Digi24.

Tennis sport commentator
Beside playing tennis, he is a public tennis commentator for various Romanian private TV stations including, most notably, Digi Sport.

Published volumes
 1987 – Planetarium, Albatros, Bucharest, 1987 – The Prize of the European Congress of Science-Fiction, Montpellier, France
 1991 – The Time of the Empty Colt, Cartea Românească, 
1998, second edition, Polirom 
 1993 – The Empire of Crooked Mirrors, Adevarul Society, anthology of science-fiction literature
 1997 – The Children of the Beast (DU Style)
1998, second edition, Polirom 
 1998 – Dead Time, Polirom 
 2000 – Omohom-Speculative Fictions, Polirom 
 2000 – Romania, transfer picture, Polirom 
 2001 – A Corpse Filled Up with Newspapers, Polirom 
 2004 – The Romanian Nobel, Polirom 
 2004 – Mind's Sport, Polirom 
 2004 – The Freedom of Hatred, Polirom 
 2005 – The Shakespeare Trigram- Speculative Fictions
 2005 – Orgasmus comunistas
 2007 – The Luxury of Death, Polirom 
 2009 – Scattered Words, Polirom 
 2011 – The Deaf Movie in a Silent Romania. Politics and Propaganda in the Romanian Fiction Movie (1912–1989), Polirom 
 2013 – Filmar, Polirom
 2016 – Viaţa şi Opera (Life and Oeuvre), Polirom

References

Declaratia din adevarul.ro

Romanian columnists
Romanian essayists
Romanian literary critics
Romanian newspaper editors
Romanian newspaper founders
Romanian novelists
Romanian male novelists
Romanian science fiction writers
Romanian male short story writers
Romanian short story writers
Romanian television personalities
Romanian translators
Writers from Bucharest
Politehnica University of Bucharest alumni
Adevărul columnists
Adevărul editors
1956 births
Living people
Male essayists
Free Media Awards winners